Florida Township is one of thirteen townships in Parke County, Indiana, United States. As of the 2010 census, its population was 2,378 and it contained 1,073 housing units.

History
Florida Township was established in 1821, the same year the county was created, though it was first settled circa 1816. It was named after a township in the state of New York, from which pioneer David Loree had emigrated.

The Harry Evans Covered Bridge, Roseville Covered Bridge, Thorpe Ford Covered Bridge, and Zacke Cox Covered Bridge were listed on the National Register of Historic Places in 1978.

Geography

Cities, towns, villages
 Rosedale

Unincorporated towns
 Coxville at 
 Hudnut at 
 Jessup at 
 Lyford at 
 Numa at 
 West Atherton at 
(This list is based on USGS data and may include former settlements.)

Cemeteries
The township contains these five cemeteries: Adams, Bound, Mount Pleasant, Orlea and Rukes.

Major highways
  U.S. Route 41

Airports and landing strips
 Heaton Private Airport

School districts
 Southwest Parke Community School Corporation

Political districts
 State House District 42
 State Senate District 38

References
 
 United States Census Bureau 2009 TIGER/Line Shapefiles
 IndianaMap

Bibliography

External links
 Indiana Township Association
 United Township Association of Indiana
 City-Data.com page for Florida Township

Townships in Parke County, Indiana
Townships in Indiana